The 22nd season of Taniec z gwiazdami, the Polish edition of Dancing with the Stars, started on 1 March 2019. This is the ninth season aired on Polsat. Paulina Sykut-Jeżyna and Krzysztof Ibisz returned as host and Iwona Pavlović, Ola Jordan and Andrzej Grabowski returned as judges. Michał Malitowski return due to injury only in Season Finale.

Couples

Scores

Red numbers indicate the lowest score for each week.
Green numbers indicate the highest score for each week.
 indicates the couple eliminated that week.
 indicates the returning couple that finished in the bottom two or three.
 indicates the couple saved from elimination by immunity.
 indicates the winning couple.
 indicates the runner-up.
 indicates the couple in third place.

Average score chart 
This table only counts for dances scored on a 30-points (scores by Michał Malitowski are excluded in Season Finale) scale.

Highest and lowest scoring performances 
The best and worst performances in each dance according to the judges' 30-point scale (scores by Michał Malitowski are excluded in Season Finale) are as follows:

Couples' highest and lowest scoring dances

According to the 30-point scale (scores by Michał Malitowski are excluded in Season Finale):

Weekly scores
Unless indicated otherwise, individual judges scores in the charts below (given in parentheses) are listed in this order from left to right: Iwona Pavlović, Andrzej Grabowski and Ola Jordan (In Season Finale also Michał Malitowski).

Week 1: Season Premiere
No elimination took place.

Running order

Week 2

Running order

Week 3: Integration Trip Night 
Running order

Week 4: Italian Night 
Running order

Week 5: Animated Films Night 
Running order

Week 6: Hometown Glory 
Running order

Week 7 
Running order

Week 8: Hollywood Hits Night
Running order

Week 9: Picnic Night 
Running order

Week 10: Semifinal
Running order

Dance-off

Running order

Week 11: Season Finale
Running order

Other Dances

Dance chart
The celebrities and professional partners danced one of these routines for each corresponding week:
Week 1 (Season Premiere): Cha-cha-cha, Jive, Tango, Waltz, Viennese Waltz
Week 2: One unlearned dance (introducing Quickstep, Rumba, Foxtrot)
Week 3 (Integration Trip Night): One unlearned dance (introducing Salsa, Samba)
Week 4 (Italian Night): One unlearned dance (introducing Argentine Tango)
Week 5 (Animated Films Night): One unlearned dance (introducing Contemporary)
Week 6 (Hometown Glory): One unlearned dance (introducing Paso Doble) and Team Dance (Swing or Boogie-woogie)
Week 7: One unlearned dance and dance-offs
Week 8 (Hollywood Hits Night): Freestyle and one unlearned dance 
Week 9 (Picnic Night): One repeated dance and one unlearned dance
Week 10 (Semifinal): Internet users' choice, one repeated dance and dance offs
Week 11 (Season Finale): Rivals' choice, couple's favorite dance of the season and Showdance

 Highest scoring dance
 Lowest scoring dance
 Performed, but not scored
 Bonus points
 Gained bonus points for winning this dance-off
 Gained no bonus points for losing this dance-off

Guest performances

Rating figures

References

External links
 

Season 22
2019 Polish television seasons